St. Luke AME Zion Church is a historic African Methodist Episcopal Zion (AMEZ) church at 3937 12th Ave. North in Birmingham, Alabama.  It was significant in the civil rights movement.  It was added to the National Register of Historic Places in 2005.

See also
St. Luke AME Church - also in Birmingham, also significant in the civil rights movement, and also added to the NRHP in 2005

References

African-American history in Birmingham, Alabama
Methodist churches in Alabama
Churches on the National Register of Historic Places in Alabama
National Register of Historic Places in Birmingham, Alabama
Gothic Revival church buildings in Alabama
Churches completed in 1962
Churches in Birmingham, Alabama
African Methodist Episcopal Zion churches in Alabama